Chumanka is a rural locality (a selo) in Plotavsky Selsoviet, Bayevsky District, Altai Krai, Russia. The population was 193 as of 2013. There are 3 streets.

Geography 
Chumanka is located 44 km northwest of Bayevo (the district's administrative centre) by road. Plotava is the nearest rural locality.

References 

Rural localities in Bayevsky District